Sorry You've Been Troubled is a mystery play by the British-American writer Walter C. Hackett.

It premiered at His Majesty's Theatre in London's West End where it ran for 157 performances between 24 September 1929 and 1 February 1930. The original cast included Harold Huth, Hugh Wakefield, Anthony Holles, George Woodbridge, Diana Wynyard, Joan Marion, Marion Lorne and Kathleen Kelly.

Film adaptations
It has twice been adapted into films: a 1932 British film Life Goes On by Paramount British Pictures, directed by Jack Raymond and starring Elsie Randolph, Betty Stockfeld and Warwick Ward and a 1935 American film One New York Night by MGM, directed by Jack Conway and starring Franchot Tone, Una Merkel, Conrad Nagel.

References

Bibliography
 Goble, Alan. The Complete Index to Literary Sources in Film. Walter de Gruyter, 1999.
 Wearing, J.P. The London Stage 1920-1929: A Calendar of Productions, Performers, and Personnel. Rowman & Littlefield, 2014.

1929 plays
British plays adapted into films
West End plays
Plays by Walter C. Hackett